Toxomerus boscii is a species of syrphid fly in the family Syrphidae.

References

External links

 

Syrphinae
Articles created by Qbugbot
Insects described in 1842
Taxa named by Pierre-Justin-Marie Macquart